Mikkel Jensen is the name of:

Mikkel Jensen (footballer, born 1977), Danish footballer
Mikkel Jensen (footballer, born 1995), Danish footballer
Mikkel Jensen (racing driver) (born 1994), Danish racing driver
Mikkel Rygaard Jensen (born 1990), Danish footballer